White Hall (formerly, Whitehall and Randall) is a small unincorporated community in El Dorado County, California, United States. The ZIP code is 95726. The community is inside area code 530.

A post office operated at Randall from 1917 to 1937. The name Randall commemorates Albert B. Randall, its first postmaster.

References

Unincorporated communities in California
Unincorporated communities in El Dorado County, California
Populated places established in 1917